Iranian–Italian relations refers to the diplomatic relations between the Islamic Republic of Iran and the Italian Republic.

Overview
In 2005, Italy was the third largest trading partner of Iran with 7.5% of all exports to Iran. Italy was Iran's largest trading partner in the European Union in 2017.

Italy has maintained active diplomatic channels with Tehran even in periods of heightened tensions between European Union and the Islamic Republic of Iran. Despite the severity of international sanctions that substantially reduced prospects of trade with Iran, Italian officials retained communication with Iranian counterparts on soft political issues, albeit just at low-level exchanges during the President Mahmoud Ahmadinejad.

After the interim nuclear deal was agreed in 2013, Italy's Emma Bonino became the first European foreign minister to visit Tehran since the tenure of President Mohammad Khatami. In both her capacity as Italian Minister of Foreign Affairs and later as High Representative of the Union for Foreign Affairs and Security Policy, Federica Mogherini strongly backed the nuclear negotiations. She also reiterated that a breakthrough in the talks could lead to a new chapter for Iran and the West going beyond non-proliferation issues.

In 2015, during an interview with Italian broadcaster RAI, President Hassan Rouhani said that Italy was the first trade partner among European Union states for several years before the international sanctions and that Iran regards Italy as the most important country for trade and economic cooperation.

Historical relations 
The relations between Iran and Italy have ancient origins. The relationship between the two countries goes back to when the Persian Empire and the Roman Empire were the two major powers in the world. The fall of the western Roman Empire and the end of the Sasanian dynasty affected their connection, however the relationship was able to resist for centuries.

After the unification of Italy in 1861, they signed a friendship agreement and a commercial treaty in 1873. And even if during the Second World War, the alliance was interrupted momentarily, it was picked up again at the end of the conflict. Moreover, part of the Iranian intellectual elite of the late nineteenth century, who were modernist and open to the western world, found refuge in Italy during the political turmoil of the twentieth century until the constitutional revolution of 1906 .

In 1977 the President of the Republic, Giovanni Leone made a state trip to Tehran, as the head of a high-level political and economic delegation to normalize the relations between the states, especially in the economic sphere. After the Islamic revolution in 1979, Italian public opinion, led by the leftist parties sustained Iran. Meanwhile, the Italian government was aligned with the American position in favour of economic sanctions against Iran. During the Iran–Iraq War, when Iraq led by Saddam Hussein fought against Iran, Italy declared its neutrality.

Following the war and the election of Mohammad Khatami as president of the Islamic republic, the situation improved. In 1999 Khatami visited Rome to meet with the Italian government, and he remarked on the start of a new phase of reconstruction in which Italian energy companies tried to carve out a role in projects concerning infrastructures, energy, and technology. This was a time of intense commercial and economic cooperation between the countries. In the years of Mahamoud Ahmadinejad's presidency, who belonged to the conservative sphere, the diplomatic relations increased because Iran regarded Italy as one of its major western allies.

Enrico Mattei, the founder of ENI,concluded a favourable agreement in 1957 for the Iranian government, pulling ENI away from the Seven Sisters' influence. Mattei took advantage of the Suez crisis and contacted the Shah of Persia, Mohammad Reza Pahlavi. He proposed an agreement that marked a structural innovation in the world of oil companies. The deal included a company that was 50% owned by the Iranian state. What remained would be divided between Eni and NIOC, granting Iran a total share of 75%. On 14 March 1957 a deal between Eni and NIOC was signed and in the same year, on 8 September the SIRIP, Società Irano-Italienne des Pétroles, was born. The agreement failed and Mattei died in 1962 in an aeroplane crash.

Italy was the first commercial partner of Iran from 2006 to 2012. In those same years, since Iran decided to keep pursuing its plan to develop and use nuclear energy, the US and the EU imposed economic and financial sanctions on some key sectors for Iran. Those penalties weighed on its trade with Italy. In 2013 Hassan Rouhani, the seventh President of the Islamic Republic of Iran considered Italy as the door to establish the relations with the rest of the EU. Until the sanctions imposed by the Security Council on Iran for the enrichment of depleted uranium, Iranian oil reserves covered 90% of Italy's oil needs. The embargo was revoked only in January 2014, followed by an Interim Deal between UE+3 and Iran, established in 2013. The following year, after the conclusion of the deal on nuclear energy oil, an Italian delegation guided by Carlo Calenda, consisting in Confindustria's leaders and CEI that represented 180 small-medium companies and 12 banks, arrived in Iran. The goal was to prepare the state for the removal of penalties imposed in 2006 for the nuclear program.

After the entry into force of the JCPOA in 2015 and the interruption of the sanctions, Rouhani chose Italy for his first state trip. On this occasion, the memorandum of understanding for a total of twenty billion euros was signed. Among the most important groups involved there were Pessina, Saipem, Danieli, Fincantieri, Gavio Group, COET, Vitali, SEA, Enel, Belleli, Stefano Boeri Architetti, Itway, Italtel, Marcegaglia, Fata Spa, IMQ, and so on.

Many agreements never materialized, due to the primary sanctions imposed by the US, but also secondary sanctions not related to the nuclear problem. Large banking groups, due to their links with the US market, could not make transactions to the Iran market. They risked incurring US Treasury sanctions. Part of this problem was addressed in January 2018 by the Ministry of Economic Development with the proposal of a Master Credit Agreement. It intended to regulate any future financing agreement concluded between Invitalia Global Investment and Iranian banks for a total amount of five billion euros and was covered by a sovereign guarantee issued by the Iranian state. The agreement, however, is still waiting for the transformation into a decree-law to become effective.

Economic relations 

Italy has been and is significantly present in Iran's foreign relations. Although the economic and commercial relations between the two countries have experienced ups and downs over time, Italy has ranked at the top in Europe in terms of volume of trade with the Islamic Republic of Iran. In 2010, the volume of trade relations between the two countries exceeded seven billion euros. In 2015 with the imposition of severe sanctions on Iran, the volume of trade fell to less than two billion euros. With the signing of the Nuclear Agreement and subsequently the exchange of visits by the President of the Islamic Republic of Iran and the then Prime Minister of Italy to Rome and Tehran respectively, agreements and MoUs for a value of 30 billion euro were signed for economic and commercial collaborations between the two countries, as well as the opening of a credit line (MCA) which had laid the foundations for an important leap forward in bilateral relations.

Economic relations between the two countries have had an evolution after the signing of the nuclear agreement. Economic operators and political parties in both countries, through a precise understanding of mutual national interests, have been able to create the conditions for the development of relations. Therefore, the significant decrease in the volume of economic relations between the two countries in 2021 is mainly due to external factors and in the last year in particular with two main elements: the US threats against Iran's economic partners in Italy and the coronavirus epidemic.

Cultural relations
In accordance with a Treaty on cultural cooperation between Italy and Iran from 1958, and the following Executive Protocols, the Embassy of Italy in Iran enhances bilateral cultural relations in the fields of the development and spread of the Italian language, musical, artistic, theatrical, cinematographic and scientific heritage. The Treaty was signed by Amintore Fanfani, President of the Council and Minister of Foreign Affairs, and His Majesty The Sciahinsciah of Iran. The Treaty was at the basis of the following treaties between the two countries.

Following the Treaty of 1958 between 1978 and 1979 a Cultural exchange program was developed between the Italian republic government and the imperial government of Iran. A cultural exchange program for the years 1996-1997-1998-1999 also made it possible to further develop exchanges in the field of culture and education and thus contribute to the friendship between the two countries.

Important is the Memorandum of Understanding between the two countries signed by the Minister of Industry, Trade and Crafts with the task of Tourism Pierluigi Bersani and the Minister of Culture and Islamic Orientation Ataollah Mahajerani on 10 November 1999.

In 2000, a further Executive program of cultural collaboration was signed for the years 2000–2004 on the basis of which the two countries committed to cooperate in the university field and language teaching (thanks to the stipulation of agreements and conventions between the individual universities and the exchange of educational and scientific activities), in the cultural and art field (music, theater, cinema, festivals, cultural events), cultural heritage, scientific cooperation, in the radio and television and information field, sport and tourism.

The movie "Soraya", directed by Lodovico Gasparini, was released in 2003, depicting the story of Soraya Esfandiary Bakhtiari. Anna Valle played the leading role of the Persian Princess who was forced to divorce from the Shah of Iran after failing to give him an heir to the Sun Throne. The film was released in Italy on Rai Uno.

In 2004, Italian experts were working on plans to expand the National Museum of Iran beyond its current capacity, from 2,200 to 6,000.

On the occasion of the 11th Week of the Italian Language in the World, the Italian School of Tehran organized a series of events, created with the collaboration of Iranian universities that offer Italian language courses. The Week was inaugurated on Sunday 16 October 2011 with a study day dedicated to Eugenio Montale. Subsequently, some Italian films were also proposed (Il Postino, Pane e Tulipani, Benvenuti al Sud).

A further program, Executive Collaboration Program in the fields of culture, education, higher education and research, was signed in 2015 between the Ambassador of the Islamic Republic of Iran in Italy, Jahanbakhsh Mozaffari, and the Director General for the Promotion of the Country System of the Minister of Foreign Affairs and International Cooperation and Ambassador Andrea Meloni.

In November 2019, the exhibition entitled "Italy and Iran, 60 years of collaboration on cultural heritage" was inaugurated at the National Museum of Iran. The exhibition tells the 60 years of the Italian archaeological presence in Iran and the bilateral collaboration in the field of preservation and enhancement of the Iranian cultural heritage.

In December of the same year, the first phase of the "Italy-Iran cooperation project for the development of cultural heritage, tourism and handicrafts" began. The project involves the promotion and exchange of Italian and Iranian knowledge and skills in the field of management and development of the historical, artistic and cultural heritage.

See also
 Roman-Persian relations
 Foreign relations of Iran
 Foreign relations of Italy
 Iran–European Union relations

References

External links
Vanderbilt Television News Archive: Iran-Italy relations during president Khatami's presidency

 
Italy
Bilateral relations of Italy